The 1993 PBA All-Star Game is the annual all-star weekend of the Philippine Basketball Association (PBA). The events were held on June 6, 1993 at the Cuneta Astrodome in Pasay.

Skills challenge winners
Slam Dunk Competition: Vergel Meneses
Three-point shootout: Elmer Cabahug (11-10 over Allan Caidic in the sudden death shootout after the first two rounds)

Special Feature
Showbiz stars entertain the fans with a basketball game as they await the main PBA All-Star event. Four Da Boys, led by Willie Revillame with 22 points and playing-coach Phillip Salvador won over D'Kool Doods of Edu Manzano, 85-71. Among those who also played were Cesar Montano, Jinggoy Estrada, Anjo Yllana and former PBA player turned comedian Jimmy Santos, who provide the comic relief.

All-Star Game

Rosters

North All-Stars:
Ato Agustin (San Miguel)
Samboy Lim (San Miguel)
Allan Caidic (San Miguel)
Hector Calma (San Miguel)
Jerry Codiñera (Purefoods)
Alvin Patrimonio (Purefoods)
Victor Pablo (Seven-Up)
Bobby Jose (Alaska)
Ronnie Magsanoc (Shell)
Vergel Meneses (Swift)
Chito Loyzaga (Ginebra)
Manny Victorino (Ginebra)
Coach: Derrick Pumaren (Seven-Up)

South All-Stars:
Nelson Asaytono (Swift)
Rudy Distrito (Swift)
Alfonso Solis (Swift)
Boy Cabahug (Purefoods)
Dindo Pumaren (Purefoods)
Abet Guidaben (Seven-Up)
Pido Jarencio (Ginebra)
Jun Limpot (Sta.Lucia)
Jojo Lastimosa (Alaska)
Ramon Fernandez (San Miguel)
Yves Dignadice (San Miguel)
Alvin Teng (San Miguel)
Coach: Norman Black (San Miguel)

Game

Recognitions
Three of the league Pioneers; Fortunato "Atoy" Co, Philip Cezar and Bernie Fabiosa were presented Plaque of Recognitions by the PBA during the All-Star Event.

References

All-Star Game
Philippine Basketball Association All-Star Weekend